Mi Amigo El Príncipe (My Friend The Prince) is the fourteenth studio album by Mexican pop singer Cristian Castro by Universal Music Latino. The album is follow-up to Viva el príncipe in which he pays a tribute to José José whom Castro considers his musical idol. The album consists of ten tracks. As with the previous album, Rafael Pérez-Botija, who wrote songs and produced albums for José José in the past, produced the album.

Track listing
 Confirmed by Allmusic.

Chart performance

Certifications

See also
 2011 in Latin music
 List of number-one Billboard Latin Albums from the 2010s
 List of number-one Billboard Latin Pop Albums of 2011

References

José José tribute albums
2011 albums
Cristian Castro albums
Universal Music Latino albums
Spanish-language albums
Cristian Castro video albums